List of Tajik musicians includes notable Tajik musicians.

Tajikistan

Classical/Folk 
Davlatmand Kholov
Fatima Kuinova
Jurabek Murodov
Shoista Mullojonova
Zafar Nozim
Talabkhoja Sattorov
Tolib Shahidi
Ziyodullo Shahidi
Suleiman Yudakov

Pop 
Firuza Alifova
Baimurat Allaberiyev
Nargis Bandishoeva
Madina Aknazarova
Manija Dawlat
Tahmina Niyazova
Kibriyo Rajabova
Shabnam Surayyo

Rock/Metal 
Nobovar Chanorov
Oleg Fesov
Muboraksho Mirzoshoyev
Daler Nazarov
Parem

Afghanistan

Pop 
Ahmad Zahir
Mozhdah Jamalzadah
Ghezaal Enayat

Uzbekistan

Pop 
Shahzoda
Feruza Jumaniyozova
Daler Xonzoda
Yulduz Usmonova

Musicians
Tajikistan